The West Branch Croton River is a tributary of the Croton River in   Putnam and Westchester counties in the state of New York.  It lies within the Croton River watershed and is part of the New York City water supply system's Croton Watershed.

Path
The rivers headwaters drain into Sagamore Lake in the northwest part of the town of Kent in Putnam County.  From there the West Branch flows southeast one mile into Boyds Corner Reservoir, where it joins the New York City water supply system.  From Boyd's Corners it flows into West Branch Reservoir in the town of Carmel, New York. It then flows southeast into the Croton Falls Reservoir in Carmel immediately above the Westchester border, where it picks up the waters of the Middle Branch Croton River after their co-mingling in the Diverting Reservoir immediately to the north. These combined waters exit the Croton Falls Reservoir for a brief stretch of the West Branch alone, which joins the East Branch at the confluence of the Croton River proper in Croton Falls, a hamlet of the town of North Salem, New York in northern Westchester County.

See also
List of rivers of New York

References

Rivers of New York (state)
Rivers of Westchester County, New York
Rivers of Putnam County, New York
Tributaries of the Hudson River